Anne Bohnenkamp-Renken (born 17 November 1960) is a German academic who has served as the director of the Freies Deutsches Hochstift since 2003.

Life 
Bohnenkamp-Renken was born in Hilden. Bohnenkamp-Renken's father was a physicist and mathematician who worked at a Max Planck Institute, and her mother was an infant nurse.

Bohnenkamp-Renken studied German literature, philosophy, and journalism at the universities of Göttingen and Florence between 1980 and 1987. In 1992, she received her PhD from Göttingen with a dissertation about Goethe's Faust. Bohnenkamp-Renken habilitated in 2000, and she became the director of the Freies Deutsches Hochstift in June 2003.

As director, Bohnenkamp-Renken has led the Hochstift's work on a historical critical edition of Clemens Brentano. She directed the historical-critical edition of Goethe's Faust which the Hochstift created between 2009 and 2015 in conjunction with the Klassik Stiftung Weimar.

Bohnenkamp-Renken was an honorary professor of Goethe University Frankfurt from 2004 to 2012, when she became a full professor, teaching modern German literature.

Bohnenkamp-Renken is married and has two adult children.

Memberships 
 2004 Göttingen Academy of Sciences and Humanities
 2014 Akademie der Wissenschaften und der Literatur Mainz
 2016 Deutsche Akademie für Sprache und Dichtung

Selected works

References

Further reading

External links 
 Bohnenkamp-Renken's page at Goethe Universität Frankfurt am Main
 Bohnenkamp-Renken's page at the Akademie der Wissenschaft und der Literatur Mainz

1960 births
Living people
German academics
Directors of the Freies Deutsches Hochstift